was a Japanese idol girl group under Sony Music Artists and T-Palette records. The group was debuted in 2014 to commemorate the 40th anniversary of SMA. They participated in the 2014-2017 Tokyo Idol Festival. Their single "Funny Bunny" reached the 22nd place on the Weekly Oricon Singles Chart.

Discography

Albums

Mini-albums

*First original content by Idol Renaissance.

Singles

Digital Singles

DVDs

Notes

References

External links
  

Japanese idol groups
Japanese girl groups